= Trash hook =

Tool

The Trash hook is a tool used by firefighters for a variety of functions. The tool's primary purpose is to sift through trash during the overhaul stage of a dumpster fire. Secondarily, it can be used for roof ventilation and prying operations.
